Lachie Young (born 6 April 1999) is an Australian rules footballer who plays for the North Melbourne Football Club in the Australian Football League (AFL). He was selected at pick #6 in the 2019 Rookie draft. He made his senior debut against Carlton in round 5 of the 2019 season.

References

External links

Lachie Young from AFL Tables

Western Bulldogs players
Dandenong Stingrays players
1999 births
Living people
Australian rules footballers from Victoria (Australia)
North Melbourne Football Club players